Mrs Merton and Malcolm was a six-episode BBC One sitcom produced by Granada Television, and transmitted by BBC One in 1999.

The series was written by Caroline Aherne, Craig Cash and Henry Normal. Network released the series on DVD in 2008.

Format 
The main characters were Mrs. Dorothy Merton (Caroline Aherne) and her son Malcolm (Craig Cash), who live together in Heaton Norris, a suburb of Stockport in Greater Manchester, with the bedridden and almost invisible Mr Merton.

Each episode follows a very strict format, following the course of a single day. Mrs Merton and Malcolm have a conversation over the breakfast table at the start, and at the end she puts him to bed and then has an eerie one-way "conversation" with the silent Mr Merton. The events of the episode prove so exhausting or over-exciting for Malcolm that his mother always offers to ring work for him and get him the following day off.

The central event of each episode is the visit from friend of the family Arthur Capstick, played by UK sitcom veteran Brian Murphy, who mentions something to Mrs Merton (usually about the death of a neighbour) and then forgets he's said it. He has a cup of tea and is offered a snack, but dithers over which one to have, despite the fact that "they're all the same, Arthur". He then says he will pop up to see Mr Merton, but forgets to go and has to be prompted. He takes with him some type of traditional sweet treat for Mr Merton, and sits beside the bed and entertains him somehow.

In episode 3, Mr Capstick goes upstairs to see Mr Merton before he has his cup of tea. After he has his tea, he says he will go upstairs to see Mr Merton, so this radical diversion from the routine is too much for him in his senile state.

Steve Coogan is a constant presence, providing the voices for an unctuous disk jockey and Malcolm's motivational tapes, and also appearing in the last episode as the vicar. Mr Malik the chemist appears in several episodes, played by Rashid Karapiet.

The show is characterised by a strange persistence of attitudes and fashions apparently preserved from decades earlier. Malcolm is 37 and has the personality and interests of a child, although not a contemporary one: he likes building model aeroplanes. The implication is that the characters have been trapped in a timewarp since the late 1960s, and that this is probably as a result of Mrs Merton's firm insistence that things should stay as they are, even if we must occasionally make an effort to stay in touch with the present: "People don't want trifle in the 90s", as she puts it.

Episodes

Development 
The character of Mrs Merton had previously appeared for four years in her own spoof chat show, The Mrs Merton Show. In it, she very often mentioned "my son Malcolm", but he only appeared three times. On his debut appearance, he played his recorder, and for his second appearance, he enjoyed a kiss with actress Joanna Lumley. His final appearance was in the Christmas 1997 show, when he sang one line in "Perfect Day". Both characters also appeared in some advertisements for British Gas, which were the direct forerunner of the sitcom.

There are a few references to the BBC corporate hierarchy in the script. Malcolm's miserly boss at the pet shop is called Geoffrey Perkins, then the Head of Comedy at the BBC. Mr Capstick also mentions how he and Mr Merton used to go scrumping for apples in Mr Yentob's garden (a reference to Alan Yentob).

Reception 
The show achieved very good figures for a new sitcom, but the critical reception was generally hostile because of the manchild character, Malcolm. Time Out magazine described it as "possibly the most disturbing show on television". This critical reaction took the writers aback.

The writers insisted that their intention was simply to create an absurd situation for comic effect, but some critics took Malcolm to be a semi-serious depiction of mental illness or a sufferer of infantilism, and others suggested that there was something incestuous about the relationship between Malcolm and his mother.

Mrs Merton also dominates her invalid husband, who is completely bedridden and mute, and so barely exists as a character except as a lump under some bedsheets. Her one-sided conversations with him give the impression that his condition suits her lifestyle perfectly well. On Malcolm's birthday she says, "It's days like this I wish your father wasn't bedridden!" Malcolm is also quite unmoved by his father's condition; he has a go on the bouncy castle at the funeral. The only way it affects him is that it reminds him of when his pet hamster died. This aspect of the programme, combined with the lack of a laughter track (still relatively unusual for a UK sitcom at the time), caused some critics to regard the show as unbearably bleak.

As a result of the critical fallout, the writers decided to focus instead on a second series of their other creation, The Royle Family, which was far better received by both critics and audiences. A planned Christmas special episode was abandoned before the original run had finished.

References

External links
Mrs Merton & Malcolm at the BFI Film & TV Database
Mrs Merton & Malcolm BBC website

1990s British sitcoms
1999 British television series debuts
1999 British television series endings
BBC television sitcoms
Television series by ITV Studios
Television shows produced by Granada Television
Television shows set in Manchester
English-language television shows